Air Thanlwin is an airline based in Yangon, Myanmar, offering scheduled and chartered domestic flights from its base at Yangon International Airport. The airline was rebranded in October 2019 from Yangon Airways which was founded in 1996.

As one of the main domestic airlines of the Union of Myanmar, Air Thanlwin operates regular flights to Nay Pyi Taw, Bagan, Mandalay, Heho (Inle Lake), Kyaing Tong, Tachileik, Myitkyina, Thandwe, Sittway, Dawei, Myeik, Kawthaung, Lashio and charter flights to Bhamo, Putao, Kalay and others from main hub at Yangon International airport. The airline has rebranded using the same fleet, adding another ATR 72-500 XY-AJN rented from Myanmar National Airlines.

History
Yangon Airways was established in October 1996 as a domestic airline in a joint venture between Myanma Airways, the state-owned flag carrier in Myanmar, and Krong-Sombat Company of Thailand. The airline bases its headquarters and maintenance station in Yangon. In October 1997, the current owner of the airline acquired the share of the Thai company and then acquired the share of Myanmar Airways in 2005. Thereafter, the airline became a fully privately owned airline in Myanmar. The airline then evolved into a principal domestic service carrier, operating schedule and charter flight services from Yangon to 13 prime commercial and tourist destinations in Myanmar. During the past three years, Yangon Airways has been progressively gaining market share; it has about 37% in 2007 and increased to 41% in 2008.

Yangon Airways was listed by the United States Department of Treasury Office of Foreign Assets Control (OFAC) on its Specially Designated Nationals and Blocked Persons (SDN) list. Under United States federal law, Americans are prohibited from doing business with individuals or entities listed as an SDN. Yangon Airways was designated by OFAC in 2008 after having been acquired by notorious drug traffickers of the United Wa State Army.

Yangon Airways was rebranded and operated as Air Thanlwin in 2019 using the same fleet, adding another ATR 72-500 XY-AJN bought from Myanmar National Airlines.

Destinations

 
Air Thanlwin operated scheduled flights to the following domestic destinations.
 Bagan – Nyaung U Airport
 Bhamo – Bhamo Airport
 Dawei – Dawei Airport
 Heho – Heho Airport
 Khamti – Khamti Airport
 Kawthaung – Kawthaung Airport
 Kengtung – Kengtung Airport
 Lashio – Lashio Airport
 Mandalay – Mandalay International Airport base
 Myeik – Myeik Airport
 Myitkyina – Myitkyina Airport
 Naypyidaw – Naypyidaw International Airport
 Putao – Putao Airport
 Sittwe – Sittwe Airport
 Tachilek  – Tachilek Airport
 Thandwe – Thandwe Airport
 Yangon – Yangon International Airport main base

Fleet

The Air Thanlwin fleet comprises the following aircraft.

References

External links

Airlines established in 2019
Airlines of Myanmar
Companies based in Yangon